Chris Tomlinson (born August 29, 1986) is an American politician who is a member of the Maryland House of Delegates for District 5 in Carroll County, Maryland. He previously served as the third vice chairman of the Maryland Republican Party from 2020 to 2022.

Background
Tomlinson graduated from North Carroll High School in 2004, and later attended Towson University, where he earned a Bachelor of Social Science degree in electronic media and film in 2009.

Tomlinson first got involved in politics in 2015 when he unsuccessfully ran for the mayor of Manchester, Maryland. His candidacy was challenged by the town's Board of Supervisors of Elections, who denied his certification after arguing that he did not live in the town when he filed to run for mayor. Tomlinson challenged the board's decision, claiming that he had lived in the town since April 2014. The board reversed its decision a few days later, allowing Tomlinson to run for mayor. Tomlinson was defeated in the mayoral election by incumbent mayor Jennifer Warner, receiving 27.3 percent of the vote.

In 2017, Tomlinson began working in the Maryland Transit Administration, eventually becoming a manager in the agency's Office of State Procurement. In November 2017, Tomlinson was appointed to the Carroll County Republican Central Committee.

In 2022, Tomlinson filed to run for the Maryland House of Delegates in District 5. During the primary, he ran on a ticket with state Senator Justin Ready and state Delegate April Rose. Tomlinson won the Republican primary election on July 19, 2022, coming in second place behind Rose. He ran unopposed in the general election.

In the legislature
Tomlinson was sworn into the Maryland House of Delegates on January 11, 2023, with the start of the Maryland General Assembly's 445th legislative session. He is a member of the House Judiciary Committee.

Political positions
Tomlinson supported President Donald Trump in the 2020 presidential election, attending a Trump rally in Hershey, Pennsylvania in December 2019.

During his 2022 House of Delegates campaign, Tomlinson said he planned to introduce legislation in the 2023 legislative session that would improve human resources practices in state government by requiring the fiscal notes of bills to include the number of new employees needed to accomplish the legislation's goals. He also said he supported legislation to limit the powers of the Maryland State Board of Education.

Electoral history

References

External links
 

1986 births
21st-century American politicians
Republican Party members of the Maryland House of Delegates
Living people
Towson University alumni